Petar Fartunov (born 3 June 1989 in Samokov) is a Bulgarian ski jumper, born 1989. His personal best is 175 metres from Planica 2009. He has also competed in the Olympic Games in Turin 2006.

Sources

Bulgarian male ski jumpers
Olympic ski jumpers of Bulgaria
Ski jumpers at the 2006 Winter Olympics
1989 births
Living people
People from Samokov
Sportspeople from Sofia Province